Abdel Hady Khallaf Allah (5 March 1946 – 2008) was an Egyptian boxer. He competed at the 1968 Summer Olympics and the 1972 Summer Olympics. At the 1972 Summer Olympics, he lost in first fight to Hosain Eghmaz of Iran.

References

External links
 

1946 births
2008 deaths
Egyptian male boxers
Olympic boxers of Egypt
Boxers at the 1968 Summer Olympics
Boxers at the 1972 Summer Olympics
Sportspeople from Cairo
Featherweight boxers
20th-century Egyptian people